This is a list of European cities by elevation, located above —divided by cities with over 10,000 people, and those with 100,000  or more. The list of those with more than 10,000 people is further divided by elevation above sea level.

Cities over 100,000 inhabitants

 Burgos 
 León 
 Kislovodsk 
 Salamanca 
 Alcorcón 
 Valladolid 
 Alcobendas 
 Vladikavkaz 
 Albacete 
 Granada 
 Madrid 
 Leganés 
 Fuenlabrada 
 Móstoles 
 Pristina 
 Parla 
 Getafe 
 Brașov 
 Alcalá de Henares 
 Sofia 
 Innsbruck 
 Torrejón de Ardoz 
 Bern 
 Munich 
 Vitoria-Gasteiz 
 Sarajevo 
 Saint-Étienne

Cities over 10,000 inhabitants

Over 1,000 m

 Davos 
 Kruševo 
 Briançon 
 Tyrnyauz 
 Ávila 
 Soria 
 Guarda 
 San Giovanni in Fiore 
 Smolyan 
 San Lorenzo de El Escorial 
 Andorra la Vella 
 Sjenica 
 Segovia 
 La Chaux-de-Fonds

901–1,000 m

 Cuenca 
 Guadarrama 
 Moralzarzal 
 Béjar 
 Samokov 
 Enna 
 Zelenchukskaya 
 Le Locle 
 Collado Villalba 
 Teruel 
 Guadix 
 Meßstetten 
 Karachayevsk 
 Tomislavgrad

801–900 m

 Korçë 
 Colmenar Viejo 
 Einsiedeln 
 Astorga 
 Burgos 
 Sankt Georgen im Schwarzwald 
 Reinosa 
 Karachayevsk 
 Zakopane 
 León 
 Bruneck 
 Imst 
 Jaca 
 Pale 
 Pontarlier 
 Potenza 
 Tarancón 
 Gheorgheni 
 Kislovodsk 
 Füssen 
 Salamanca 
 Vatra Dornei

701–800 m

 Aranda de Duero 
 Tailfingen 
 Velingrad 
 Bulle 
 Herisau 
 Val-de-Ruz 
 Sinaia 
 Randazzo 
 Pljevlja 
 Bronte 
 Villingen-Schwenningen 
 Pernik 
 Erice 
 Mussomeli 
 Palencia 
 Saalfelden am Steinernen Meer 
 Majadahonda 
 Krynica-Zdrój 
 Sonthofen 
 Judenburg 
 Val-de-Travers 
 Freudenstadt 
 Mende 
 Albstadt, Ebingen 
 Livno 
 Immenstadt im Allgäu 
 Schongau 
 Altusried 
 Ronda 
 Burladingen 
 Medina del Campo 
 La Roda 
 Alcorcón 
 Peiting 
 Las Rozas de Madrid 
 Berane 
 L'Aquila 
 Tres Cantos 
 Garmisch-Partenkirchen 
 Guadalajara 
 Münsingen 
 Bad Dürrheim 
 Isny 
 Kastoria 
 Ohrid 
 Campobasso

601–700 m

 Trossingen 
 Struga 
 Valladolid 
 Piazza Armerina 
 Alcorcón 
 Avezzano 
 Vladikavkaz 
 Brig-Glis 
 Boadilla del Monte 
 Miesbach 
 Murnau 
 Albacete 
 Donaueschingen 
 Granada 
 Kriva Palanka 
 Lenggries 
 Kaufbeuren 
 Humanes de Madrid 
 St. Gallen 
 Kempten 
 Lienz 
 Poprad 
 San Sebastián de los Reyes 
 Podujevo 
 Winterberg 
 Toplița 
 Aš 
 Debar 
 Leganés 
 Fuenlabrada 
 Móstoles 
 Villars-sur-Glâne 
 Bad Tölz 
 Trofaiach 
 Brunete 
 Prilep 
 Tripoli 
 Bad Wurzach 
 Leutkirch 
 Pfullendorf 
 Villanueva de la Cañada 
 Zamora 
 Parla 
 Knittelfeld 
 Rionero in Vulture 
 Tuttlingen 
 Delčevo 
 Gossau 
 Telfs 
 Bad Wörishofen 
 Le Puy-en-Velay 
 Kežmarok 
 Gap 
 Covilhã 
 San Cataldo 
 Getafe 
 Câmpulung Moldovenesc 
 Marienberg 
 Kičevo 
 Bitola 
 Pedara 
 Caltagirone 
 Rottweil 
 Geretsried 
 Kaufering 
 Leonforte 
 Memmingen 
 Annaberg-Buchholz 
 Brașov 
 Corleone 
 Ptolemaida 
 Quba

Up to 600 m

 Nowy Targ 
 Bakal 
 Penzberg 
 Alcalá de Henares 
 Chur 
 Traunstein 
 Bad Waldsee 
 Starnberg 
 Bludenz 
 Freiburg im Üechtland 
 Landsberg am Lech 
 Trecastagni 
 Höhenkirchen-Siegertsbrunn 
 Jesenice 
 Steffisburg 
 Ostermundigen 
 Worb 
 Peißenberg 
 Aosta 
 Grünwald 
 Gauting 
 Sigmaringen 
 Sofia 
 Žďár nad Sázavou 
 Mariánské Lázně 
 Liptovský Mikuláš 
 Oberhaching 
 Aurillac 
 Innsbruck 
 Waldkirchen 
 Köniz 
 Wil 
 Ferizaj 
 Caltanissetta 
 Torrejón de Ardoz 
 St. Johann im Pongau 
 Kirchseeon 
 Uzwil 
 Taufkirchen 
 Weilheim 
 Selb 
 Prachatice 
 Adrano 
 Clausthal-Zellerfeld 
 Spittal an der Drau 
 Thun 
 Ebersberg 
 Muri bei Bern 
 Burgdorf 
 Unterhaching 
 Wangen im Allgäu 
 Auerbach 
 Ottobrunn 
 Feldkirchen in Kärnten 
 Nuoro 
 Mazzarino 
 Neubiberg 
 Traunreut 
 Belpasso 
 Feldkirchen-Westerham 
 Gräfelfing 
 Münchberg 
 Schwaz 
 Stará Ľubovňa 
 Bischofshofen 
 Dießen am Ammersee 
 Ponferrada 
 Haar 
 Planegg 
 Leoben 
 Münsingen 
 Bern 
 Germering 
 Puchheim 
 Wetzikon 
 Gostivar 
 Siders 
 Regen 
 Marktredwitz 
 Hechingen 
 Vaterstetten 
 Humpolec 
 Ittigen 
 Jihlava 
 Munich 
 Digne-les-Bains 
 Gubbio 
 Grafing bei München 
 Belp 
 Grammichele 
 Ragusa 
 Zwettl 
 Vitoria-Gasteiz 
 Sarajevo 
 Balingen 
 Fürstenfeldbruck 
 Illnau-Effretikon 
 Königsbrunn 
 Saint-Étienne 
 Schwyz 
 Toledo 
 Sitten 
 Friedberg 
 Travnik 
 Biancavilla 
 Seekirchen am Wallersee 
 Bruckmühl 
 Kirchheim 
 Markt Schwaben 
 Gjilan 
 Peja 
 Kufstein 
 Kapfenberg 
 Villach 
 Beloretsk

See also
List of cities by elevation
List of capital cities by altitude
List of highest towns by country
List of South American cities by elevation

Elevation
Vertical position
European cities